Nicoleta Albu (born 10 August 1988) is a Romanian rower. She finished fourth in the women's eight at the 2012 Summer Olympics.

She has won four World Championship silver medals (women's double sculls 2009 and 2013 and women's eights in 2009 and 2013) and one bronze (women's eights 2010), and four European gold medals (women's double sculls 2011 and 2012 and women's eights in 2013 and 2014) and two bronzes (women's coxed four 2011 and 2012).

References

External links
 
 
 
 

1988 births
Living people
Romanian female rowers
Rowers at the 2012 Summer Olympics
Olympic rowers of Romania
World Rowing Championships medalists for Romania
European Rowing Championships medalists
Sportspeople from Brăila
21st-century Romanian women